Taizé is a commune in the Saône-et-Loire department in the region of Bourgogne-Franche-Comté in eastern France.

Pilgrimage site

The commune contains two churches; the small Parish church and the much larger "Church of Reconciliation". The latter church can hold over 6,000 people. Both churches are run by the Taizé Community, an ecumenical monastic community founded in 1940 by Brother Roger. It is composed of more than one hundred brothers, from Protestant and Catholic traditions, who originate from about thirty countries across the world.

Taizé is today known as a place of pilgrimage, primarily for young adults: every week, hundreds and thousands of visitors, generally between the ages of 17 and 30, visit Taizé for an experience of prayer and communal life.

Geography
The river Grosne forms all of the commune's western border.

Miscellaneous
The asteroid 100033 Taizé was discovered by Freimut Börngen on April 9, 1990. It is named in honour of Taizé.

Gallery

See also
Christian pilgrimage
Communes of the Saône-et-Loire department

References

External links
The Taizé Community
Brother Roger's funeral - photogalleries

Christian pilgrimages
Communes of Saône-et-Loire